Eastern Sword was an unarmed 3,785-ton steam merchant ship that was completed in 1920 at the Uraga Dry Dock Co. Ltd, Uraga, Japan. She was owned by the Sword Line Inc., New York, New York, and she was homeported out of this same city.

Description
The vessel was constructed by the Uraga Dry Dock Co. Ltd in Uraga, Japan with the yard number 166 and completed in August 1920. The ship was constructed on behalf of the United States Government and acquired by the Sword Steam Ship Line Inc. in 1931. Eastern Sword was registered in New York, New York.

Sinking
Eastern Sword, operated by Alcoa Steamship Company, departed New York with seven officers and twenty-nine crew members, en route to Georgetown, British Guiana in ballast to pick up a load of bauxite. The vessel made a stop at Trinidad and for the entire route, she was unescorted. The ship had been traveling at  when attacked. Two torpedoes struck in quick succession on the port side at the #4 hold, aft of the midship house, causing the ship to settle rapidly by the stern. The explosion had destroyed the radio shack, preventing a distress message from being sent. Three officers and nine crewmen abandoned ship in one lifeboat and landed the next day at Georgetown. One crewman was picked up from a raft by the fishing boat Ocean Star on 6 May and landed in Georgetown. The remaining crew were lost.

References

Merchant ships
Maritime incidents in May 1942
Ships built by Uraga Dock Company
1920 ships
Ships sunk by German submarines in World War II
World War II shipwrecks in the Caribbean Sea